Berengar Elsner von Gronow (born 7 January 1978)  is a German politician for the populist Alternative for Germany (AfD) and since 2017 member of the Bundestag.

Life and achievements

Gronow was born 1978 in the former West German capital Bonn.

In 2013 he entered the newly founded AfD and after the 2017 German federal election he became member of the Bundestag, the first federal legislative body.

Gronow is a leading member of the dovish factional cluster Alternative Mitte (alternative midpoint) of the AfD.

References

Living people
1978 births
Members of the Bundestag for North Rhine-Westphalia
Politicians from Bonn
Members of the Bundestag 2017–2021
Members of the Bundestag for the Alternative for Germany